"Goodnight Kisses" is a song by American R&B singer Charlie Wilson. It was released on October 7, 2014. The song is the first single from the seventh studio album Forever Charlie (2015).

Track listing
Digital download
"Goodnight Kisses" — 3:37

Music video 
On October 7, 2014, Charlie uploaded the audio video for "Goodnight Kisses" on his YouTube and Vevo account.

Chart performance

References

2014 singles
Charlie Wilson (singer) songs
2014 songs
RCA Records singles
Songs written by Emile Ghantous